Edy Jakariya (born 18 November 1983) is an Indonesian hurdler. He competed in the men's 110 metres hurdles at the 2004 Summer Olympics.

References

1983 births
Living people
Athletes (track and field) at the 2004 Summer Olympics
Indonesian male hurdlers
Olympic athletes of Indonesia
Southeast Asian Games medalists in athletics
Place of birth missing (living people)
Southeast Asian Games bronze medalists for Indonesia
Competitors at the 2003 Southeast Asian Games
21st-century Indonesian people